Gekkoolithus is an oogenus of fossil gecko egg. Unfortunately, gecko eggs have not been well-studied, and their fossils are very rare, making classification of them difficult. Gekkolithus eggs are very similar to those of the modern Phelsuma delandis in size, shape, and structure.

References

Egg fossils
Fossil parataxa described in 1996